In Greek mythology, Melantho (Ancient Greek: Μελανθώ) may refer to the following women:

 Melantho, also called Melanthea, a Phthian princess as the daughter of King Deucalion and Pyrrha, daughter of Epimetheus and Pandora. She was not probably the sister of Hellen, Protogenea, Amphictyon, Pandora, Thyia, Orestheus, Marathonios, Pronous, and Candybus. Melantho was seduced by Poseidon the shape of a dolphin and by him, bore a son Delphus. In one account, Melantheia instead married King Hyamus of Hyampolis, son of Lycorus, and by him the mother of two daughters, Celaeno and Melanis, of whom either might have been mother of Delphus by Apollo.
Melantho, also called Melantomice, an Argive queen as the wife of King Criasus. She was the mother of Phorbas, Ereuthalion and Cleoboea.
Melantho, the disloyal maid of Penelope.

Notes

References 

 Apollodorus, The Library with an English Translation by Sir James George Frazer, F.B.A., F.R.S. in 2 Volumes, Cambridge, MA, Harvard University Press; London, William Heinemann Ltd. 1921. ISBN 0-674-99135-4. Online version at the Perseus Digital Library. Greek text available from the same website.
 Gantz, Timothy, Early Greek Myth: A Guide to Literary and Artistic Sources, Johns Hopkins University Press, 1996, Two volumes:  (Vol. 1),  (Vol. 2).
 Hesiod, Catalogue of Women from Homeric Hymns, Epic Cycle, Homerica translated by Evelyn-White, H G. Loeb Classical Library Volume 57. London: William Heinemann, 1914. Online version at theio.com
 Homer, The Odyssey with an English Translation by A.T. Murray, PH.D. in two volumes. Cambridge, MA., Harvard University Press; London, William Heinemann, Ltd. 1919. . Online version at the Perseus Digital Library. Greek text available from the same website.
 Pausanias, Description of Greece with an English Translation by W.H.S. Jones, Litt.D., and H.A. Ormerod, M.A., in 4 Volumes. Cambridge, MA, Harvard University Press; London, William Heinemann Ltd. 1918. . Online version at the Perseus Digital Library
 Pausanias, Graeciae Descriptio. 3 vols. Leipzig, Teubner. 1903.  Greek text available at the Perseus Digital Library.
Publius Ovidius Naso, Metamorphoses translated by Brookes More (1859-1942). Boston, Cornhill Publishing Co. 1922. Online version at the Perseus Digital Library.
Publius Ovidius Naso, Metamorphoses. Hugo Magnus. Gotha (Germany). Friedr. Andr. Perthes. 1892. Latin text available at the Perseus Digital Library.
 Stephanus of Byzantium, Stephani Byzantii Ethnicorum quae supersunt, edited by August Meineike (1790-1870), published 1849. A few entries from this important ancient handbook of place names have been translated by Brady Kiesling. Online version at the Topos Text Project.

Women of Poseidon
Mortal parents of demigods in classical mythology
Queens in Greek mythology
Argive characters in Greek mythology
Thessalian characters in Greek mythology
Mythology of Argos
Thessalian mythology